Sphaerocinidae is an extinct taxonomic family of fossil sea snails, sea butterflies, marine opisthobranch gastropod mollusks within the superfamily Cavolinioidea.

References 

 
Cavolinioidea